Sorgun is a Turkish place name and may refer to:

 Sorgun, Güdül, a town in Güdül district of Ankara Province, Turkey
 Sorgun, Mersin, a village in Erdemli district of Mersin Province, Turkey
 Sorgun, Yozgat, a district in Yozgat Province, Turkey

See also 
 Sorgun Dam, a dam in Turkey